Nilesh Cabral (born 10 July 1972)  is an Indian politician and a cabinet Minister in the Government of Goa headed by Manohar Parrikar. He is a member of the Bharatiya Janata Party and represents the Curchorem constituency in the  Goa Legislative Assembly. Cabral holds the portfolios of Power, Non-Conventional Energy, Law & Judiciary as well as Legislative Affairs.

Personal life
Nilesh Cabral was born on 10 July 1972. An engineer, Cabral earned a Diploma in Mining and Mine Surveying from the Government Polytechnic, Panaji in 1992.

By profession, Cabral is a transport contractor as well as barge owner. He owns several trucks and earth moving machines. He is the Chairman of the Goa Chess Association since June 2017.

Career
Cabral was once a close confidante of Shyam Satardekar and also worked for the latter's victory in the 2007 Goa Legislative Assembly election. But later, differences arose between Satardekar and Cabral. Cabral first contested the 2012 Goa Legislative Assembly election from Curchorem as a candidate of the Bharatiya Janata Party, defeating Shyam Satardekar of the Indian National Congress. In 2012, Cabral was seen as an "outsider" as he did not belong to the Rashtriya Swayamsevak Sangh cadre. After his victory in the 2012 Goa Legislative Assembly election, Nilesh Cabral was appointed the Chairman of the Goa Tourism Development Corporation. He served in this position from 24 April 2012 to 9 January 2017.

He successfully contested the 2017 Goa Legislative Assembly election and was elected from the Curchorem constituency as a Bharatiya Janata Party candidate. He was once again appointed the Chairman of the Goa Tourism Development Corporation in April 2017 and held the post till 7 November 2018.

Since 24 September 2018, Cabral is the Cabinet Minister of Power, Non-Conventional Energy, Law & Judiciary as well as Legislative Affairs in the Government of Goa.

In 2020, Cabral said that he was ready to debate with his Delhi counterpart over the electricity models in their respective jurisdictions, and not with an official of the Delhi Jal Board. Raghav Chadha traveled from Delhi to Goa to debate; however, later on, the debate took place between Valmiki Naik and Nilesh Cabral
 In 2022, Cabral won the assembly election on BJP ticket from Curchorem constituency.

References

External links 
 Goa Environment Minister Responds To Protests In Goa | Faye D'Souza

Goa MLAs 2022–2027
Living people
People from South Goa district
Bharatiya Janata Party politicians from Goa
Goa MLAs 2017–2022
1972 births